Teenage Bounty Hunters is an American teen comedy-drama streaming television series created by Kathleen Jordan for Netflix which was released on August 14, 2020. In October 2020, the series was canceled after one season. Blake McCormick and Jenji Kohan are executive producers, along with Tara Herrmann and Robert Sudduth serving as showrunner.

Premise
After denting their father's pickup truck, high school students and fraternal twins Sterling and Blair Wesley fall into bounty hunting for grizzled bounty hunter Bowser Simmons in order to pay for the truck's repair, and without their parents' knowledge.

Cast and characters

Main

 Maddie Phillips as Sterling Wesley, Blair's fraternal twin sister and a student at Willingham Academy who is trying to balance her life as a bounty hunter with being fellowship leader at her Christian high school
 Anjelica Bette Fellini as Blair Wesley, Sterling's more rebellious fraternal twin sister who also goes to Willingham Academy and who is also a bounty hunter
 Kadeem Hardison as Bowser Simmons, a grizzled bounty hunter and mentor to Sterling and Blair, who also runs a frozen yogurt shop named Yogurtopia
 Virginia Williams as Debbie Wesley, the twins' mother; and as Dana Culpepper, Debbie's twin sister

Recurring

 Spencer House as Luke Creswell, Sterling's boyfriend
 Mackenzie Astin as Anderson Wesley, the twins' father
 Eric Graise as Ezequiel, April's friend
 Wynn Everett as Ellen Johnson, the fellowship teacher at Willingham Academy
 Devon Hales as April Stevens, Sterling's nemesis who is jealous that Sterling is named fellowship leader
 Charity Cervantes as Hannah B., April's friend
 Myles Evans as Miles Taylor, Blair's love interest
 Carolyn Jones Ellis as Cathy, an employee of Yogurtopia
 Cliff 'Method Man' Smith as Terrance Coin, a rival bounty hunter to Bowser 
 Shirley Rumierk as Yolanda, the owner of Yolanda's Bail Bonds; Bowser's boss and ex-sister-in-law
 Given Sharp as Horny Lorna, a promiscuous student at Willingham Academy
 Jacob Rhodes as Franklin, Luke's golf teammate

Episodes

Production

Development
The series was originally titled as Slutty Teenage Bounty Hunters, created by Kathleen Jordan, and executive produced by Robert Sudduth, Jenji Kohan, Tara Herrmann, and Blake McCormick. The pilot is directed by Jesse Peretz. On July 22, 2020, upon series premiere date announcement, the series was retitled as Teenage Bounty Hunters, dropping the word "slutty". The series premiered on August 14, 2020. The official trailer for the series was released on July 30, 2020. On October 5, 2020, Netflix canceled the series after one season.

Casting
On June 28, 2019, Maddie Phillips, Anjelica Bette Fellini, Kadeem Hardison, and Virginia Williams had been cast in starring roles. Upon the official trailer announcement, Mackenzie Astin, Method Man, Myles Evans, Spencer House, Devon Hales, Shirley Rumierk were cast in undisclosed capacities.

Filming
The series was filmed in Atlanta, Georgia from July to October 2019.

Reception

Kristen Baldwin of Entertainment Weekly gave the series a B+ and wrote a review saying, "Brisk and funny, warm and wonderfully oddball, Teenage Bounty Hunters is a binge everyone— except maybe Old Testament God—can get behind." Reviewing the series for The Hollywood Reporter, Inkoo Kang described the series as "winsome and well-crafted" and said, "Teenage Bounty Hunters is propelled by excellent comic performances by Phillips and Fellini, who don't look all that similar but do share a fizzy chemistry, especially in their crackerjack-timed quips and clairvoyant communications."

Review aggregator Rotten Tomatoes reported an approval rating of 93% based on 28 reviews, with an average rating of 7.23/10. The website's critics consensus reads, "Teenage Bounty Hunters has snappy one-liners and style to spare, and though its peculiar premise at times fizzles, it's held together by Maddie Phillips and Anjelica Bette Fellini's killer chemistry." Metacritic gave the series a weighted average score of 72 out of 100 based on 7 reviews, indicating "generally favorable reviews".

The series has been included on many best of 2020 television show lists by critics' including ones published on The New Yorker, The New York Times, and Vulture.

Vulture included Teenage Bounty Hunters on its list on "The Best Overlooked 2020 TV Series". Kathryn VanArendonk praised the show, writing, "It’s snappy and smart, full of sharp twists and emotional revelations but always true to its primary duo, twin sisters Sterling (Maddie Phillips) and Blair (Anjelica Bette Fellini), and their long-suffering bounty-hunter mentor, Bowser (Kadeem Hardison). It has an immediately distinctive voice that supports rather than distracts from the twisty plotting, something mystery shows always aim for and so, so rarely achieve. It’s so funny, and so legitimately fantastic."

References

External links 

2020 American television series debuts
2020 American television series endings
2020s American black comedy television series
2020s American comedy-drama television series
2020s American high school television series
2020s American LGBT-related comedy television series
2020s American LGBT-related drama television series
2020s American sex comedy television series
2020s American teen drama television series
Christianity in popular culture
English-language Netflix original programming
Evangelicalism in popular culture
Fictional bounty hunters
Religion in popular culture
Religious comedy television series
Television series about Christianity
Television series about sisters
Television series about teenagers
Television series about twins
Television shows filmed in Atlanta
Television shows filmed in Georgia (U.S. state)
Television shows set in Atlanta
Works about twin sisters
Bisexuality-related television series